Roktokorobi is Bengali Thriller Drama web-series starring Raima Sen, Vikram Chatterjee, Rooqma Ray, Tulika Basu, Laboni Sarkar, Shantilal Mukherjee, Bhaswar Chatterjee, Abhijit Guha and Haridas Chatterjee. It is produced by Sahana Dutta and Rohit Samanta and directed by Sayantan Ghoshal.
The series premiered on ZEE5 on 3 February 2023.

Plot 
The story revolves around psychologist Satyaki (Vikram Chatterjee) visiting his aunt's place in a Uraldanga and comes across several mysteries in the house.

Cast 
Vikram Chatterjee: Satyaki 
Raima Sen: Ranja 
Tulika Basu: Satyabati 
Haridas Chatterjee: Kalyan (Bhulu Jethu) 
Shantilal Mukherjee: Radhaprasanna 
Laboni Sarkar: Bithi 
Bhaswar Chatterjee: Saibal 
Rooqma Ray: Bidula 
Angana Ray: Meghla 
Kinjal Nanda: Ashish

Marketing 
The trailer of Roktokorobi was released on January 16, 2022.

Reception 
Sangbad Pratidin rated it 3 out of 5 stars.  Rating the show 4 out of 5 stars, OTTplay in its review commented, “Despite the lacunas, Roktokorobi is a fantastic production. A crime and its multidimensional perspectives are beautifully addressed in the show.”

References

External links 
 
 Roktokorobi Trailer on YouTube
 Roktokorobi on ZEE5

2023 Indian television series debuts
ZEE5 original programming
Indian thriller television series
Indian web series
Thriller web series